Luftflotte 6 (Air Fleet 6) was one of the primary divisions of the German Luftwaffe in World War II.  It was formed on May 5, 1943 from Luftwaffenkommando Ost in Central Russia (Smolensk). The Luftwaffe units listed here were detached in Belarus, East Poland, East Prussia, Ukraine, Slovakia and in Russian-occupied lands for air support of Axis forces in the sector; with command offices in Pryluky and Belarus during June 26, 1944 within the Eastern front.

Strategical reconnaissance

Stab/FAGr.2 (Baranovichi)
1.(F)/11 (Baranovichi)
1.(F)/14 (Baranovichi)
NSt.4 (Bobruisk)

Bombers (Medium/Heavy)

14.(Eis)/KG.3 (Puchivichi)
Stab/KG.1 Hindenburg (Prohwehren)
II./KG.1 Hindenburg (Prohwehren)

IV.Fliegerkorps (IV.Air Corps) Brest-Litovsk

Strategical reconnaissance

1(F)/100 (Pinsk)

Tactical reconnaissance

Stab/NAGr.4 (Biała Podlaska)
3/NAGr.4 (Kobryn)
12/NAGr.4 (Brest-Litovsk)

Bombers (Medium)

10.(Kroat)KG.3 (Smolensk)
Stab/KG.4 (Białystok)
II./KG.4 (Baranovichi)
III./KG.4 (Baranovichi)
Stab/KG.27 (Krosno)
I./KG.27 (Krosno)
II./KG.27 (Krosno)
III./KG.27 (Mielec)
Stab./KG.53 (Radom)
I./KG.53 (Radom)
II./KG.53 (Piastov)
III./KG.53 (Radom)
Stab./KG.55 (Dęblin-Irena)
I./KG.55 (Dęblin-Ułęż)
II./KG.55 (Dęblin-Irena)
III./KG.55 (Groyek)

1.Fliegerdivision (1° Air Division) Orscha

Tactical reconnaissance
Stab/NAGr.10 (Toloschin)
2/NAGr.4 (Orscha)
13/NaGr.14 (Toloschin)

Tactical support
III./St. G.77 (Smolensk)
I.(Kroat)ST.G. 1 (Eichwalde)

Land air strike
I/SG.1 (Toloschin)
II/SG.1 (Vinla)
10(Pz)/SG.1 (Boyari)
10(Pz)/SG.3 (Toloschin)
Stab/SG.9 (Schippenbeil)
Stab/SG.10 (Dokudovo)
III/SG.10 (Dokudovo)

Fliegerführer 1 (Flight Director 1) Minsk

Tactical reconnaissance
12./NAGr.12 (Mogilev)
2./NAGr.5 (Budslav)
4./NAGr.31 (Budslav)

Night land attack
Stab/NSGr.2 (Lida)
1./NSGr.2 (Bobruisk)
3./NSGr.2 (Lida)
4./NSGr.2 (Mogilev)
1.Ostfl. St.(Russische) (Minsk) 
1/NSGr.1 (Kovno) 
2/NSGr.1 (Kovno) 
Stab I./Eins. Gr. Fl. Sch. Div. (Borisov) 
Russisch Lehr Fl. Div. (Borisov) 
2/Eins. Gr. Fl. Sch Div. (Borisov) 
3/Eins. Gr. Fl. Sch. Div. (Borisov) 
1/Eins. Gr. Fl. Sch. Div. (Dubinskaya)

Jagdabschnittführer 6 (Fighter Direction 6) Pryluky

Fighters
I.Stab/JG.51 (Orscha)
II.Stab./JG.51 (Orscha)
I/JG.51 (Orscha)
III./JG.51 (Bobruisk)
IV./JG.51 (Mogilev)
III./JG.11 (Dokudovo)

Night fighters
I.Stab/NJG.100 (Baranovichi)
1./NJG.100 (Baranovichi)
1./NJG.100 (Biala-Podlaska)
1./NJG.100 (detach) (Baranovichi)
1./NJG.100 (Detach) (Dokudovo)
3./NJG.100 (Radom)
3./NJG.100 (Dokudovo)
4./NJG.100 (Puchivichi)

Jagdabschnittführer Ostpreussen (Fighter Direction in East Prussia) Powunden

Fighters
Stab/JG.52 (Königsberg)
I./JG.52(Detach) (Königsberg)
II./JG.52(Detach) (Königsberg)

Night fighters
II./NJG.100 (Powunden)
II./NJG.100 (Detach) (Eichwalde)
II./NJG.100 (Detach) (Prohwehren)

Luftwaffe special transport units (1944-45)
This unit was based in Muhldorf, Bavaria, which also included helicopters including:
Focke-Achgelis Fa 223 Drachen
Flettner Fl 265
Flettner 282B Kolibri
For operations on the Western and Eastern front, the airfields in France (West) and East Prussia undertook some of the special liaisons, personnel transport, rescue of wounded personnel, observation/air patrol and other similar missions in the last days of the conflict.

Transportstaffeln 40 (East area)

Commanding officers

Generalfeldmarschall Robert Ritter von Greim, 5 May 1943 – 24 April 1945
Generaloberst Otto Deßloch, 27 April 1945 – 8 May 1945

Chief of staff
Generalmajor Friedrich Kless, 11 May 1943 – 8 May 1945

References
Notes

References
 Luftflotte 6 @ Lexikon der Wehrmacht
 Luftflotte 6 @ The Luftwaffe, 1933-45

German Air Fleets in World War II
Military units and formations established in 1943
Military units and formations disestablished in 1945